Ballydown is a townland of 529 acres in County Down, Northern Ireland. It is situated in the civil parish of Seapatrick and the historic barony of Iveagh Upper, Lower Half.

Archaeology
The townland contains a rath (at grid ref: J1484 4672) which is a Scheduled Historic Monument and is also partly in the townland of Lisnaree.

See also 
List of townlands in County Down

References

Townlands of County Down
Civil parish of Seapatrick